HMS Widemouth Bay was a  anti-aircraft frigate of the Royal Navy, named for Widemouth Bay in Cornwall.

During construction the contract was changed, and the ship was completed as a Bay-class frigate and named Widemouth Bay on 5 October 1944. Launched on 19 October, she was completed on 13 April 1945, the first of her class to be completed.

Service history
After sea trials and training Widemouth Bay sailed in July 1945. She arrived at the Forward Base of the British Pacific Fleet at Manus, Admiralty Islands, in August, just after the Japanese surrender. She remained on the Far East Station, based at Hong Kong, for the next year and a half, supporting post-war repatriation operations, carrying out patrols and escort duties.

In September 1948 Widemouth Bay returned to the UK, and was assigned to the Fishery Protection Patrol, operating in the waters around the UK. From January to July 1949, her commanding officer was Anthony Thorold. In July 1949, when she was decommissioned and laid up in Reserve at Sheerness.

Widemouth Bay was recommissioned in June 1951 for service in 4th Training Flotilla of the Home Fleet, based at Rosyth, also acting as an escort ship, and taking part in the Coronation Naval Review at Spithead in June 1953. The ship was decommissioned again in September 1953 and put into Reserve at Chatham.

Widemouth Bay was placed on the Disposal List in 1957, and sold to the British Iron & Steel Corporation (BISCO) for breaking up by Hughes Bolckow. She arrived in tow at the breaker's yard in Blyth on 23 November 1957.

References

Publications
 

 

1944 ships
Bay-class frigates
Ships built in Belfast
Ships built by Harland and Wolff